Javorník is a municipality and village in Ústí nad Orlicí District in the Pardubice Region of the Czech Republic. It has about 200 inhabitants.

Administrative parts
The village of Vysoká is an administrative part of Javorník.

References

External links

Villages in Ústí nad Orlicí District